Marcel Black (born March 25, 1951) is an American Democratic Party politician who was a member of the Alabama House of Representatives from 1990 to 2018. He represented the 3rd district for most of his tenure.

Outside politics, he is an attorney with the company Black and Hughston, P.C..

Life
Black was born on March 25, 1951. He is married to Martha Rose Tubb and has two children.

Politics
Black was elected for District 2 for only one term, from November 1990 to November 1994.

He represented District 3 for most of his tenure, from 1995 to 2018. He announced that he would be retiring at the end of the term.

He was the ranking minority member on the financial services committee and the education policy committee.

References

1951 births
Living people
Democratic Party members of the Alabama House of Representatives
University of Alabama alumni
Alabama lawyers
People from Colbert County, Alabama
20th-century American politicians
21st-century American politicians